Matthew Hopkins ( 1620 – 12 August 1647) was an English witch-hunter whose career flourished during the English Civil War. He was mainly active in East Anglia and claimed to hold the office of Witchfinder General, although that title was never bestowed by Parliament.

The son of a Puritan minister, Hopkins' career as a witch-finder began in March 1644 and lasted until his retirement in 1647. He and his associates were responsible for more people being hanged for witchcraft than in the previous 100 years, and were solely responsible for the increase in witch trials during those years. He is believed to have been responsible for the executions of over 100 alleged witches between the years 1644 and 1646. Hopkins and his colleague John Stearne sent more accused people to the gallows than all the other witch-hunters in England of the previous 160 years.

Early life
Little is known of Matthew Hopkins before 1644, and there are no surviving contemporary documents concerning him or his family. He was born in Great Wenham, Suffolk and was the fourth son of six children. His father, James Hopkins, was a Puritan clergyman and  vicar of  St John's of Great Wenham, in Suffolk. The family at one point held title "to lands and tenements in Framlingham 'at the castle. His father was popular with his parishioners, one of whom in 1619 left money to purchase Bibles for his then three children James, John and Thomas.

Thus Matthew Hopkins could not have been born before 1619, and could not have been older than 28 when he died, but he may have been as young as 25. Although James Hopkins had died in 1634,  when the iconoclast William Dowsing, commissioned in 1643 by the Parliamentarian  Earl of Manchester "for the destruction of monuments of idolatry and superstition", visited the parish in 1645 he observed that "there was nothing to reform". Hopkins' brother John became Minister of South Fambridge in 1645 but was removed from the post a year later for neglecting his work. Hopkins states in his book The Discovery of Witches (1647) that he "never travelled far ... to gain his experience".

According to tradition, Hopkins used his recently acquired inheritance of a hundred marks to establish himself as a gentleman and to buy the Thorn Inn in Mistley. From the way that he presented evidence in trials, Hopkins is commonly thought to have been trained as a lawyer, but there is scant evidence to suggest this was the case.

Witch-hunting

Following the Lancaster Witch Trials (1612–1634), William Harvey, physician to King Charles I of England, had been ordered to examine the four women accused, and from this there came a requirement to have material proof of being a witch. The work of Hopkins and John Stearne was not necessarily to prove any of the accused had committed acts of maleficium, but to prove that they had made a covenant with the Devil. Before this point, any malicious acts on the part of witches were treated identically to those of other criminals, until it was seen that, according to the then-current beliefs about the structure of witchcraft, they owed their powers to a deliberate act of their choosing.

Witches then became heretics to Christianity, which became the greatest of their crimes and sins. Within continental and Roman Law witchcraft was crimen exceptum: a crime so foul that all normal legal procedures were superseded. Because the Devil was not going to "confess", it was necessary to gain a confession from the human involved.

The witch-hunts undertaken by Stearne and Hopkins mainly took place in East Anglia, in the counties of Suffolk, Essex, Norfolk, Cambridgeshire and Huntingdonshire, with a few in the counties of Northamptonshire and Bedfordshire. They extended throughout the area of strongest Puritan and Parliamentarian influences which formed the powerful and influential Eastern Association from 1644 to 1647, which was centred on Essex. Both Hopkins and Stearne would have required some form of letters of safe conduct to be able to travel throughout the counties.

According to his book The Discovery of Witches, Hopkins began his career as a witch-finder after he overheard women discussing their meetings with the Devil in March 1644 in Manningtree. In fact, the first accusations were made by Stearne,   and Hopkins was appointed as his assistant. Twenty-three women were accused of witchcraft and were tried at Chelmsford in 1645. As the English Civil War was in progress, the trial was conducted not by justices of assize, but by justices of the peace presided over by the Earl of Warwick. Four died in prison and nineteen were convicted and hanged. During this period, excepting Middlesex and chartered towns, no records show any person charged of witchcraft being sentenced to death other than by the judges of the assizes.

Hopkins and Stearne, accompanied by the women who performed the pricking, were soon travelling over eastern England, claiming to be officially commissioned by Parliament to uncover and prosecute witches. Together with their female assistants, they were well paid for their work, and it has been suggested that this was a motivation for his actions. Hopkins stated that "his fees were to maintain his company with three horses", and that he took "twenty shillings a town". The records at Stowmarket show their costs to the town to have been £23 plus his travelling expenses.

The cost to the local community of Hopkins and his company were such that, in 1645, a special local tax rate had to be levied in Ipswich. Parliament was well aware of Hopkins and his team's activities, as shown by the concerned reports of the Bury St Edmunds witch trials of 1645. Before the trial, a report was carried to the Parliament"as if some busie men had made use of some ill Arts to extort such confession"that a special Commission of Oyer and Terminer was granted for the trial of these witches. After the trial and execution the Moderate Intelligencer, a parliamentary paper published during the English Civil War, in an editorial of 4–11 September 1645 expressed unease with the affairs in Bury.

Methods of investigation
Methods of investigating witchcraft drew heavy inspiration from the Daemonologie of King James, which was directly cited in Hopkins' The Discovery of Witches. Although torture was nominally unlawful in England, Hopkins often used techniques such as sleep deprivation to extract confessions from his victims. He would also cut the arm of the accused with a blunt knife, and if she did not bleed, she was said to be a witch. Another of his methods was the swimming test, based on the idea that as witches had renounced their baptism, water would reject them. Suspects were tied to a chair and thrown into water: all those who "swam" (floated) were considered to be witches. Hopkins was warned against the use of "swimming" without receiving the victim's permission first. This led to the legal abandonment of the test by the end of 1645.

Hopkins and his assistants also looked for the Devil's mark. This was a mark that all witches or sorcerers were thought to possess that was said to be dead to all feeling and would not bleed – although it was sometimes a mole, birthmark or an extra nipple. If the suspected witch had no such visible marks invisible ones could be discovered by pricking. Therefore, "witch prickers" were employed, who pricked the accused with knives and special needles looking for such marks, normally after the suspect had been shaved of all body hair. It was believed that the witch's familiar, an animal such as a cat or dog, would drink the witch's blood from the mark, as a baby drinks milk from the nipple.

Opposition
Hopkins and his company quickly ran into opposition after their work began, but one of his main antagonists was John Gaule, vicar of Great Staughton in Huntingdonshire. Gaule had attended a woman from St Neots who was held in gaol charged with witchcraft until such time as Hopkins could attend. Upon hearing that the woman had been interviewed, Hopkins wrote a letter to a contact asking whether he would be given a "good welcome". Gaule hearing of this letter wrote his publication Select Cases of Conscience touching Witches and Witchcrafts;  London, (1646)dedicated to Colonel Walton of the House of Commonsand began a programme of Sunday sermons to suppress witch-hunting.

In Norfolk, both Hopkins and Stearne were questioned by justices of the assizes about the torturing and fees. Hopkins was asked if methods of investigation did not make the finders themselves witches, and if with all his knowledge did he not also have a secret, or had used "unlawful courses of torture". By the time this court session resumed in 1647, Stearne and Hopkins had retired, Hopkins to Manningtree and Stearne to Bury St Edmunds.

Colonial impact
Hopkins' witch-hunting methods were outlined in his book The Discovery of Witches, which was published in 1647. These practices were recommended in law books. During the year following the publication of Hopkins' book, trials and executions for witchcraft began in the New England colonies with the hanging of Alse Young of Windsor, Connecticut on May 26, 1647, followed by the conviction of Margaret Jones.  As described in the journal of Governor John Winthrop, the evidence assembled against Margaret Jones was gathered by the use of Hopkins' techniques of "searching" and "watching".

Jones' execution was the first in a witch-hunt that lasted in New England from 1648 until 1663.  About eighty people throughout New England were accused of practising witchcraft during that period, of whom fifteen women and two men were executed. Some of Hopkins' methods were employed during the Salem Witch Trials, which occurred primarily in Salem, Massachusetts in 1692–93. These trials resulted in 19 executions for witchcraft, one man, Giles Corey, pressed to death for refusing to plead, and 150 imprisonments.

Death and legacy

Matthew Hopkins died at his home in Manningtree, Essex, on 12 August 1647, probably of pleural tuberculosis. He was buried a few hours after his death in the graveyard of the Church of St Mary at Mistley Heath. In the words of historian Malcolm Gaskill, Matthew Hopkins "lives on as an anti-hero and bogeyman – utterly ethereal, endlessly malleable".  According to historian Rossell Hope Robbins, Hopkins "acquired an evil reputation which in later days made his name synonymous with fingerman or informer paid by authorities to commit perjury".

What historian James Sharpe has characterised as a "pleasing legend" grew up around the circumstances of Hopkins' death, according to which he was subjected to his own swimming test and executed as a witch, but the parish registry at Mistley confirms his burial there.

References
Notes

Footnotes

Bibliography

Further reading

External links
 
 
 
Animated/Audio Story of Hopkins and his demise
History of the Essex Witch Trials
Witch-Finder General by George Knowles
Diary of Witchfinder General trials published online

1647 deaths
17th-century deaths from tuberculosis
People from Babergh District
Witch hunters
Year of birth uncertain
Year of birth unknown
Tuberculosis deaths in England
Witch trials in England